Partialism is sexual fetish with an exclusive focus on a specific part of the body other than genitals.  Partialism is categorized as a fetishistic disorder in the DSM-5 of the American Psychiatric Association only if it causes significant psychosocial distress for the person or has detrimental effects on important areas of their life. In the DSM-IV, it was considered a separate paraphilia (not otherwise specified), but was merged into fetishistic disorder by the DSM-5. Individuals who exhibit partialism sometimes describe the anatomy of interest to them as having equal or greater erotic attraction for them as do the genitals.

Partialism occurs in heterosexual, bisexual, and homosexual individuals. Foot fetishism is considered one of the most common partialisms.

Types
The following are some of the partialisms commonly found among people:

See also
Body worship
Erogenous zone

References

Sexual fetishism
Paraphilias